To ignite is the first step of firelighting.

Ignite may also refer to:

Music
Ignite (band), a melodic hardcore band from Orange County, California
Ignite (Econoline Crush album), 2007
Ignite (Shihad album), 2010
"Ignite" (Eir Aoi song), a single by Japanese singer Eir Aoi
"Ignite" (K-391 song), a single by Norwegian music producer K-391, featuring DJ Alan Walker, Julie Bergan and Korean artist Seungri
"Ignite" (The Damned song), a song by The Damned on their 1982 album Strawberries

Other uses
Ignite (event), a series of events where speakers have five minutes to talk on a subject
Ignite (game engine), a game engine for EA Sports games
Ignite (microprocessor), a stack-based RISC microprocessor architecture
Ignite (youth program), a program for gifted and talented young people in South Australia
Ignite, the name used by Stream Energy for its multi-level marketing arm
Apache Ignite, an open-source distributed database
Ignite!, an education software company in the USA
NBA G League Ignite, a developmental basketball team which is affiliated but does not compete in the NBA G League
Ignite, a magazine published by Northeast Ohio Medical University
IGNITE, a brand of disposable vape pens

See also
Ignition (disambiguation)
Ignitor (disambiguation)